Lieutenant-General Lloyd Clarke Campbell CMM, CD (born September 1947) is a retired Canadian air force general who was Chief of the Air Staff in Canada from 2000 to 2003.

Career
Campbell joined the Royal Canadian Air Force in 1965 and trained initially as a navigator, then as a fighter pilot. He served as Commanding Officer of 419 Tactical Fighter Training Squadron in Cold Lake, Alberta and by 1990 he was Assistant Chief of Staff (Plans and Policy) at Headquarters Allied Air Forces Central Europe. He became Commanding Officer of 4 Fighter Wing and Base Commander of CFB Baden-Soellingen in 1992, Director General Force Development at National Defence Headquarters in 1993 and then Director General Strategic Planning in 1995 before being appointed Commander 1 Canadian Air Division / Canadian NORAD Region in 1998. He went on to be Chief of the Air Staff in 2000 before retiring in 2003.

Honours

Notelist

References

|-

|-

Commanders of the Order of Military Merit (Canada)
Canadian Forces Air Command generals
Living people
Year of birth missing (living people)
Place of birth missing (living people)